John Edwards (born 1875; date of death unknown) was an English footballer, noted for his strength and erratic behaviour, who played as a half-back.

Career
Edwards joined Burslem Port Vale of the Football League Second Division in February 1894. He was a regular for the rest of the season, and scored his first two goals in the Football League on 10 March, in a 5–3 win over Lincoln City at Athletic Ground. On 14 April, the final game of the season, he scored Vale's consolation goal in a 2–1 loss to Liverpool at Anfield. After seven appearances in 1894–95, he transferred to Stockport County in November 1894. He returned to Vale in January 1896, but only played three league games before leaving at the end of the season. He spent time with Grays United, and was transferred to Queens Park Rangers in May 1902. He then moved to South West England and playing for Cornish side Essa in 1903 when he signed for Plymouth Argyle ahead of the club's first season in professional football. Edwards a reserve right-half during his time with the club and made three appearances in all competitions. He was released in 1904 and returned to Essa.

Career statistics

References

1875 births
Footballers from Staffordshire
English footballers
Association football defenders
Port Vale F.C. players
Stockport County F.C. players
Queens Park Rangers F.C. players
Plymouth Argyle F.C. players
Grays Athletic F.C. players
English Football League players
Southern Football League players
Western Football League players
Year of death missing